The 1994 Scott Tournament of Hearts Canadian women's national curling championship, was played February 26 to March 5 at the Waterloo Recreational Sports Complex in Waterloo, Ontario.

Teams

Standings

Results

Draw 1

Draw 2

Draw 3

Draw 4

Draw 5

Draw 6

Draw 7

Draw 8

Draw 9

Draw 10

Draw 11

Draw 12

Draw 13

Draw 14

Draw 15

Draw 16

Draw 17

TieBreaker 1

TieBreaker 2

Playoffs

Semi-final

Final

References

Scotties Tournament of Hearts
Scott Tournament of Hearts
Sport in Waterloo, Ontario
Curling in Ontario
March 1994 sports events in Canada
February 1994 sports events in Canada
1994 in Ontario
1994 in women's curling